Michael John Pratt (7 June 1931 – 10 July 1976) was an English actor, musician, songwriter and screenwriter, known for his work on British television in the 1960s and 1970s.

Early life and musical career
Early in his career, Mike Pratt worked in advertising, while also taking some part-time acting roles. He left his office job in the mid-1950s. With three friends (including Lionel Bart), he then drove around Europe in an old-style London taxi.

Upon returning to England, he earned a living as a jazz and skiffle musician in London clubs. An accomplished guitarist and pianist, in the 1950s, he jammed with the Vipers Skiffle Group at the 2 I's club in London with his friend Tommy Steele. Pratt can be seen jamming skiffle on a 1950s Pathé News clip with other musicians of the era including members of the Shadows. A successful songwriter, Pratt collaborated with Bart and Steele on many of Steele's early hits in the late 1950s and early 1960s. To enable Steele to start to film his life story, co-writers Steele, Bart and Pratt, wrote twelve songs in seven days. A Steele-Pratt collaboration, "A Handful of Songs", originally a hit for Tommy Steele in 1957, became the theme tune to a long-running Granada Television children's programme of the same name in the late 1970s. They also contributed to the writing of the song "Rock with the Caveman". Bart and Pratt received the 1957 Ivor Novello Award for Best Song Musically and Lyrically for "Little White Bull". He won a further Ivor Novello award for "Handful of Songs". In 1961, he wrote the music and lyrics for The Big Client, a play which was produced at the Bristol Old Vic from 28 November 1961. Pratt also co wrote the title song to the 1961 film comedy Double Bunk

Acting career
Pratt appeared in numerous plays between 1965 and 1967. From 25 May 1966, he appeared at the Aldwych Theatre in Tango, a play by Slawomir Mrozek, alongside Patience Collier, Peter Jeffrey, Ursula Mohan and Dudley Sutton, under director Trevor Nunn.

He is best known for his role as Jeff Randall in the late 1960s ITC detective series Randall and Hopkirk (Deceased) alongside Kenneth Cope and Annette Andre. Pratt also wrote episode two of the series, titled "A Disturbing Case".

He also appeared in TV series such as No Hiding Place, The Saint, Gideon's Way, Z-Cars, Danger Man, Out of the Unknown, Redcap, The Baron, Man in a Suitcase, The Champions, Callan, UFO (episode "The Psychobombs"), The Expert, Hadleigh, Jason King, Arthur of the Britons, Softly, Softly: Taskforce, Crown Court, Father Brown, Oil Strike North and The Adventures of Black Beauty, in which he had a semi-regular role. His last television role was in the BBC drama series The Brothers as airline pilot Don Stacy.

His film career included roles in This Is My Street (1964), The Party's Over (1965), Roman Polanski's Repulsion (1965), Robbery (1967), A Dandy in Aspic (1968), The Fixer (1968), Goodbye Gemini (1970), Sitting Target (1972), Assassin (1973), the horror anthology The Vault of Horror (1973), and Swallows and Amazons (1974).

He joined the Royal Shakespeare Company in 1966, appearing on stage throughout the rest of the 1960s and the early 1970s.

Death
Mike Pratt died from lung cancer in July 1976, aged 45. The following month, a show was staged at the Aldwych Theatre in London in his memory. The cast included Glenda Jackson, Kenneth Haigh and John Le Mesurier. Of his co-star in Randall & Hopkirk (Deceased), Kenneth Cope said:
"Michael was a great loss, both to the industry and as a friend."

Personal life
His son is Guy Pratt, a session bass guitarist best known for his live performances with Pink Floyd (since 1987) and offshoot solo projects with David Gilmour and Nick Mason.

Filmography

References

External links
 

1931 births
1976 deaths
Deaths from lung cancer in England
English male television actors
English male screenwriters
English male stage actors
English songwriters
Male actors from London
Royal Shakespeare Company members
Ivor Novello Award winners
English jazz pianists
English jazz guitarists
English male guitarists
20th-century English male actors
20th-century English musicians
20th-century British guitarists
British male jazz musicians
20th-century English screenwriters
20th-century British male musicians
20th-century British musicians